Konstantin Igorevich Pozdniakov (born 24 July 1952, Leningrad, USSR) is a Russian-French linguist who works on the comparative-historical linguistics of the Mande, Atlantic, and Niger-Congo families. He also works on Rongorongo of Easter Island.

Education
In 1974, Pozdniakov graduated from the West African Languages Department (in the Department of African Studies, Oriental Department) of Leningrad State University. In 1978, he defended his thesis at the Institute of Linguistics of the Academy of Sciences of the USSR (Moscow) on the comparative study of Mande languages.

Career
From 1978-1982 he worked at the Soviet cultural mission in Dakar, Senegal. From 1982–1997, he was a researcher at the Museum of Anthropology and Ethnography of the Academy of Sciences of the USSR / RAS (Kunstkamera) in Leningrad / St. Petersburg. In 1995, he defended his doctoral dissertation on the reconstruction of the grammar of Atlantic languages.

Since 1997, he has been a professor at the Institut national des langues et civilisations orientales (INALCO) in Paris and a researcher at the LLACAN (Languages and cultures of Africa) research unit of the French National Center for Scientific Research (CNRS). From 2011–2016, he was a senior member of the Institut Universitaire de France.

Research interests
reconstruction of the vocabulary and grammar of the Atlantic languages, and etymological dictionary of the Atlantic languages (with Guillaume Segerer)
Proto-Niger-Congo reconstruction, including noun classes and numerals
quantitative comparative linguistics
morphology
phonotactics
decipherment of Rongorongo (Easter Island)

References

Living people
1952 births
Linguists of Niger–Congo languages
Linguists from Russia
Russian Africanists
French National Centre for Scientific Research scientists
Rongorongo